All the Rockers is a compilation album by the rock band April Wine. The tracks cover the main touring years from 1973 to 1983.

Track listing 
All tracks written by Myles Goodwyn unless otherwise noted.
 "Anything You Want, You Got It" – 4:42
 "I Like to Rock" – 4:30
 "Roller" – 4:17
 "All Over Town" – 2:55
 "Hot on the Wheels of Love" (M. Goodwyn, S. Lang) – 3:11
 "Tonite" – 4:11
 "Future Tense" – 4:08
 "21st Century Schizoid Man" (R. Fripp, M. Giles, G. Lake, I. McDonald, P. Sinfield) – 6:24
 "Crash and Burn" – 2:32
 "Oowatanite" (J. Clench) – 3:50
 "Don't Push Me Around" – 3:14
 "Get Ready for Love" – 4:14
 "Tellin' Me Lies" – 3:01
 "Blood Money" – 5:22
 "Gimme Love" (M. Goodwyn, Hovaness "Johnny" Hagopian) – 3:58
 "Weeping Widow" (Robert Wright, AKA. Art La King) – 3:53
 "Victim for Your Love" – 4:17

Personnel 
 Myles Goodwyn – vocals, guitar, keyboards
 Steve Lang – bass, background vocals
 Jim Clench – bass, vocals
 Brian Greenway – guitar, vocals
 Jerry Mercer – drums & percussion, background vocals
 Gary Moffet – guitar, background vocals

Various producers 
 Myles Goodwyn – producer
 Mike Stone – producer
 Nick Blagona – producer
 Gene Cornish – producer
 Dino Danelli – producer
 Ralph Murphy – producer

References 

April Wine albums
1987 greatest hits albums
Aquarius Records (Canada) albums
Albums produced by Mike Stone (record producer)
Albums produced by Myles Goodwyn
Capitol Records compilation albums
Albums produced by Nick Blagona